Thompson is an unincorporated community in Napa County, California. It lies at an elevation of 10 feet (3 m).

References

Unincorporated communities in California
Unincorporated communities in Napa County, California